Pečkovo is a village in the municipality of Gostivar, North Macedonia.

Demographics
According to the 2002 census, the village had a total of 48 inhabitants. Ethnic groups in the village include:

Macedonians 48

References

External links

Villages in Gostivar Municipality